Nadezhda Leontievna Ustinova (27 April 18968 December 1975), née Benois (Бенуа), better known as Nadia Benois, was a Russian-born painter of still lifes and landscapes, and stage designer. Her father Leon Benois belonged to the Benois family. She was the mother of British actor, writer, and filmmaker Sir Peter Ustinov.

Nadezhda studied how to be an artist at St. Petersburg Academy of Fine Arts. On 17 July 1920, Benois married Jona Ustinov, a journalist and diplomat; the couple subsequently settled in London, where Peter, their only child, was born in 1921.  In 1935, Jona became a British subject.

In the course of her travels, Benois painted the impressionist landscapes of London street, Wales, Ireland, and Scotland. She exhibited her works in the Goupil, Redfern, Beaux-Arts, and other galleries, and is mentioned in multiple Journals from the Royal Arts Society. Some of her still lifes were acquired by the Tate Gallery in 1936. She also designed the stage for the ballet Cap over Mill, which was part of the Dark Elegies.

Later, Benois created costumes and sets for the films Vice Versa (1948) and Private Angelo (1949), both written and directed by her son, Peter.

Notable works 
 "Kensington Gardens" (Manchester City Art Gallery, 1937)
 "Three Women Painters" (Michael Parkin Gallery, 1975)

Design productions
 "Dark Elegies"(1937)
 "The Sleeping Princess" (1939)

References
 

1896 births
1975 deaths
Russian painters
Russian women painters
Russian scenic designers
Russian costume designers
Soviet emigrants to the United Kingdom
Nadezhda
20th-century British painters
20th-century Russian women artists
Ustinov family
Russian people of German descent